Season two of El Gran Show premiered on August 14, 2010, on the América Televisión network.

On October 30, 2010, Belén Estévez and Gian Frank Navarro were crowned champions, representing the city of Lima and whose dream was to treat Gian Frank's 4-year-old nephew who suffers from viral encephalitis, a disease that has him prostrate with scoliosis, blindness and seizures. Karen Dejo and Edward Mávila finished second, while Miguel "Conejo" Rebosio and Fabianne Hayashida finished third.

Cast

Couples
The celebrities were introduced during the final of the previous season. In the first week were presented to the dreamers and the dreams of each one of them.

Before the start of the program, Fiorella Avilés (Fernando Roca Rey's dreamer) retired from the show for health reasons, instead danced Katherine Mendoza (dreamer on El show de los sueños), finally Whitney Misme came as an official dreamer from the second week.

During the show, two heroines left the program, the first was Melissa Garcia, who suffered an injury in the column, being replaced by the model Danuska Zapata. The second was Jimena Lindo, who suffered a muscle tear in the leg, so actress Melania Urbina came into place from the fifth week, however, Urbina also leaves the competition for strict medical rest due to a typhoid fever, finally former contestant Karen Dejo came into place from the seventh week.

Hosts and judges
Gisela Valcárcel, Aldo Díaz and Cristian Rivero returned as hosts, while Morella Petrozzi, Carlos Alcántara, Pachi Valle Riestra and the VIP Jury returned as judges. Stuart Bishop, English choreographer who was a replacement judge last season, entered the show as a new judge since week 7.

Scoring charts

Red numbers indicate the sentenced for each week
Green numbers indicate the best steps for each week
 the couple was eliminated that week
 the couple was safe in the duel
 the winning couple
 the runner-up couple
 the third-place couple

Average score chart
This table only counts dances scored on a 40-point scale.

Highest and lowest scoring performances
The best and worst performances in each dance according to the judges' 40-point scale are as follows:

Couples' highest and lowest scoring dances
Scores are based upon a potential 40-point maximum.

Weekly scores 
Individual judges' scores in the charts below (given in parentheses) are listed in this order from left to right: Morella Petrozzi, Carlos Alcántara, Pachi Valle Riestra, VIP Jury.

 Week 1:Latin Pop 
The couples danced latin pop. No couple was sentenced in this week.
Running order

 Week 2: Cumbia 
The couples danced cumbia and a danceathon of salsa. 
Running order

Public's favorite couple: Jaime & Carol (2 pts).

 Week 3: Disco 
The couples (except those sentenced) danced disco.
Running order

 Public's favorite couple: Angie & Rubén (2 pts).
*The duel
Carlos & Fabiola: Safe
Jaime & Carol: Eliminated

 Week 4: World Dances 
The couples performed the world dances and a danceathon of cumbia.

Due to an injury, Melissa García was unable to perform, so Brian Valdizán danced with Danuska Zapata instead.
Running order

 Public's favorite couple: Angie & Rubén (2 pts).
*The duel
Carlos & Fabiola: Safe
Danuska & Brian: Eliminated

 Week 5: Merengue 
The couples (except those sentenced) danced merengue, a team dance of hula and a danceathon of salsa.

Due to an injury, Jimena Lindo withdrew from the competition, so Melania Urbina replaced her as of this week.
Running order

 Public's favorite couple: Mauricio & Akemi (2 pts).
*The duel
Carlos & Fabiola: Eliminated
Melania & Edward: Safe

 Week 6: The Pop Divas 
The couples (except those sentenced) danced pop, a team dance of jazz and a danceathon of salsa.
Orden de aparición

 Public's favorite couple: Fernando & Whitney (2 pts).
*The duel
Angie & Ruben: Safe
Adolfo & Lleruza: Eliminated

 Week 7: Hip-Hop Individual judges' scores in the charts below (given in parentheses) are listed in this order from left to right: Morella Petrozzi, Stuart Bishop, Carlos Alcántara, Pachi Valle Riestra, VIP Jury.The couples danced hip-hop (except those sentenced) and a danceathon of cha-cha-cha. In the versus, the couples faced dancing guaracha.

Due to an injury, Melania Urbina withdrew from the competition, so Karen Dejo replaced her as of this week.
Running order

 Public's favorite couple: Fernando & Whitney (2 pts).
*The duel
Mauricio & Akemi: Safe
Rebeca & Moisés: Eliminated

 Week 8: Trio Salsa 
The couples danced trio salsa involving another celebrity, and a danceathon of cumbia. In the versus, the couples faced dancing strip dance.
Running order

 Public's favorite couple: Conejo & Fabianne (2 pts).
*The duel
Angie & Ruben: Eliminated
Fernando & Whitney: Safe

 Week 9: Trio Tex-Mex/Strip Dance 
The couples danced trio tex-mex involving a member of the troupe (except those sentenced), strip dance and a danceathon of cumbia.
Running order

 Public's favorite couple: Fernando & Whitney (2 pts).
*The duel
Karen & Edward: Safe
Mauricio & Akemi: Eliminated

 Week 10: Quarterfinals Individual judges' scores in the chart below (given in parentheses) are listed in this order from left to right: Morella Petrozzi, Stuart Bishop, Pachi Valle Riestra, VIP Jury.The couples danced rock and roll, merengue (except those sentenced) and a danceathon of cumbia.
Running order

 Public's favorite couple: Fernando & Whitney (2 pts).
*The duel
Conejo & Fabianne: Safe
Fernando & Whitney: Eliminated

 Week 11: Semifinals Individual judges' scores in the charts below (given in parentheses) are listed in this order from left to right: Morella Petrozzi, Stuart Bishop, Carlos Alcántara, Pachi Valle Riestra, VIP Jury.The couples danced salsa and tango (except those sentenced). In the versus, the couples faced dancing cumbia.
Running order

 Public's favorite couple: Conejo & Fabianne (2 pts).
*The duel
Stephanie & Licky: Eliminated
Karen & Edward: Safe

 Week 12: Finals 
On the first part, all couples danced festejo while only the sentenced couples danced mix (mambo/cha-cha-cha/samba).

On the second part, the final two couples danced a favorite dance and quickstep.
Running order (Part 1)

Running order (Part 2)

 Dance chart 
The celebrities and their dreamers will dance one of these routines for each corresponding week:
 Week 1: Latin pop (Latin Pop)
 Week 2: Cumbia & the danceathon (Cumbia)
 Week 3: Disco (Disco)
 Week 4: One unlearned dance & the danceathon (World Dances)
 Week 5: Merengue, team dances & the danceathon (Merengue)
 Week 6: Pop, team dances & the danceathon (The Pop Divas)
 Week 7: Hip-Hop, the danceathon & the versus (Hip-hop)
 Week 8: Trio salsa, the danceathon & the versus (Timba)
 Week 9: Trio tex-mex, strip dance & the danceathon (Trio Tex-Mex/Strip Dance)
 Week 10: Rock and roll, merengue & the danceathon (Quarterfinals)
 Week 11: Salsa, tango & the versus (Semifinals)
 Week 12: Festejo, mix (mambo/cha-cha-cha/samba), favorite dance & quickstep (Finals)

 Highest scoring dance
 Lowest scoring dance
 Gained bonus points for winning this dance
 Gained no bonus points for losing this dance
In italic'' indicate the dances performed in the duel

Notes

References

External links

2010 Peruvian television seasons
Reality television articles with incorrect naming style